Byrgius is a lunar impact crater located in the western part of the Moon, near the limb. As a result, Byrgius appears strongly oval in shape due to foreshortening. To the northwest is the nearly ruined crater Lamarck. The rim of Byrgius is worn and eroded, with Byrgius A overlying the eastern rim and Byrgius D lying across the northwest. The floor is relatively flat and undistinguished by significant craters. Byrgius A possesses its own ray system that extends for over 400 kilometres.

Satellite craters
By convention these features are identified on lunar maps by placing the letter on the side of the crater midpoint that is closest to Byrgius.

References

External links
 

Impact craters on the Moon